The Southern California Terminal Radar Approach Control (SoCal TRACON or SCT) (radio callsign: SoCal Approach/Departure) is located in San Diego, California. SCT is a part of the Air Traffic Organization of the US Federal Aviation Administration. SCT sequences and separates air traffic in the Southern California region. It is the busiest air traffic control facility in the world.

SCT serves the following major Southern California airports (in order of volume, Class B & C), in addition to many surrounding satellite airports. 

 Los Angeles International Airport - LAX - Los Angeles
 John Wayne Airport - SNA - Costa Mesa
 Long Beach Airport - LGB - Long Beach
 San Diego International Airport - SAN - San Diego
 Marine Corps Air Station Miramar - NKX - San Diego
 Hollywood Burbank Airport - BUR - Burbank
 Ontario International Airport - ONT - Ontario

SCT is broken down into six areas and a Traffic Management Unit:

 Burbank Area: Responsible for BUR, VNY, & WHP
 Del Rey Area: Responsible for LAX, TOA & HHR departures
 Los Angeles Area: Responsible for LAX & HHR arrivals
 Coast Area: Responsible for SNA, LGB, FUL, TOA & SLI
 San Diego Area: Responsible for SAN, NKX, NZY, NFG, MYF, SEE, SDM, RNM & CRQ
 Empire Area: Responsible for ONT, AJO, PSP, RIV, SBD, RAL, CNO, EMT, & POC

Each area has five or six individual sectors that are worked by controllers. SoCal TRACON is responsible for the handling of aircraft departing and arriving these airports, generally below . SCT is responsible for sequencing inbound, separating from crossing and VFR traffic, and departing traffic. Separation is achieved by vectoring traffic and assigning altitudes.

See also
Northern California TRACON

References

Air traffic control in the United States
Aviation in California
Transportation in San Diego County, California
Transportation in Los Angeles County, California